Charles Wyatt (1758 – 13 March 1819) was an English architect and Member of Parliament for Sudbury, Suffolk.

Life
He was the son of William Wyatt (died 1780, steward to Lord Uxbridge in Staffordshire), nephew to the architects James Wyatt and Samuel Wyatt, and cousin to Sir Jeffry Wyattville. He joined the East India Company in 1780 as a cadet, sailing for India aboard the ship Mount Stewart on 27 June of the same year, but the ship was captured by the French and Spanish fleets and returned to England. His second attempt to reach India was successful, arriving in 1782. He joined the Bengal Engineers, eventually being promoted in 1800 to captain and commissioner of police.

His opportunity to design buildings came in 1798 when The Marquess of Wellesley arrived in Calcutta as Governor-General and selected Wyatt to design the new Government House, Calcutta, which opened in 1803. The design was based on Kedleston Hall. Wyatt also designed alterations to Wellesley's country residence at Barrackpore.  In June 1803 he was made Superintendent of Public Works.

Having made a fortune in India, Wyatt retired in October 1806, buying the country villa Ealing Grove outside London called, not far from Sir John Soane's villa at Pitzhanger Manor. He was elected as Tory MP for Sudbury, Suffolk in two successive parliaments, serving from 1812 to 1818.

He died in 1819 at Foley House, his London home in Portland Place. He had married Charlotte (née Greentree) Drake, widow of George Drake of the Bombay Marines, in 1787.

Gallery of architectural work

See also
Wyatts, an architectural dynasty

References

  The Wyatts An Architectural Dynasty by John Martin Robinson 1979, Oxford University Press
History of Parliament WYATT, Charles (c.1759-1819) of Foley House, Portland Place, London

1758 births
1819 deaths
Bengal Engineers officers
18th-century English architects
19th-century English architects
People from Sudbury, Suffolk
Architects from Suffolk
Charles